Norman Clyde Peak, standing  tall, is in natural company among the high peaks of the Palisades region of the Sierra Nevada in California. It raises on the main ridge of the Palisades', between Middle Palisade and Palisade Crest. Norman Clyde Glacier on its north face, and Middle Palisade Glacier on its east both feed the headwaters of the South Fork of Big Pine Creek. It is named posthumously for mountaineer Norman Clyde, who first climbed it by way of the Norman Clyde Glacier in 1930.

See also 
 Mountain peaks of California
 Palisades of the Sierra Nevada

References 

Mountains of Kings Canyon National Park
Mountains of the John Muir Wilderness
Mountains of Fresno County, California
Mountains of Inyo County, California
Mountains of Northern California